Hundertwasser's Rainy Day is a 1972 West German short documentary film about artist Friedensreich Hundertwasser rebuilding an old wooden ship called Regentag (Rainy Day). Directed by Peter Schamoni, it was nominated for an Academy Award for Best Documentary Short.

References

External links

Hundertwassers Regentag at filmarchives online

1972 films
1972 documentary films
1972 short films
West German films
1970s German-language films
German short documentary films
1970s short documentary films
Films directed by Peter Schamoni
Documentary films about painters
Documentary films about water transport
1970s German films